Anja Möllenbeck (born Anja Gündler on 18 March 1972 in Frankenberg, Saxony) is a retired German discus thrower, whose personal best throw is 64.63 metres, achieved in May 1998 in Obersuhl.

She married fellow discus thrower Michael Möllenbeck in 1996.

Achievements

External links

1972 births
Living people
People from Frankenberg, Saxony
German female discus throwers
Athletes (track and field) at the 1996 Summer Olympics
Olympic athletes of Germany
Universiade medalists in athletics (track and field)
Universiade silver medalists for Germany
Universiade bronze medalists for Germany
Medalists at the 1993 Summer Universiade
Medalists at the 1995 Summer Universiade
Sportspeople from Saxony
People from Bezirk Karl-Marx-Stadt